Ostorhinchus regula is a species of deep-water cardinalfish. To date, it has only been recorded from Guam and Condor Reef in the Carolina Islands, although the difficulty in observing and collecting this fish has led the authors who described the species to predict that it is likely to have a far wider distribution.

This species grows up to 40mm in length with five broad longitudinal yellowish-brown stripes alternating with four much narrower whitish stripes. The brown stripes go much darker on the caudal peduncle and the strong contrast of the stripes here has led to the scientific name "regula", meaning "ruler".

References

regula
Fish described in 2003
Taxa named by Thomas H. Fraser
Taxa named by John Ernest Randall